Jampa Lhakang Monastery(Nepali: जाम्पा लाकान्ग गुम्बा, Thubchen Gumba or Gompa), also called Maitreya Temple, is a Buddhist monastery located in Lo Manthang, Upper Mustang in Nepal. It was thought to be built in the 11th century AD  but later verified to be built in the 15th century AD and contains the world's largest collection of mandalas painted on its walls. The earthquake of April 2015 severely damaged these paintings and 500-year-old frescos of the floors. American Himalayan Foundation and Lo Gyalpo Jigme Cultural Conservation Foundation is helping to recover these damages.

Gallery

See also
List of monastery in Nepal

External links
Restoration project video,

References

Buddhist monasteries in Nepal
15th-century establishments in Nepal
Buildings and structures in Mustang District